is a railway station located in the central part of Itō, Shizuoka Prefecture, Japan operated by the private railroad company Izukyū Corporation.

Lines
Minami-Itō Station is served by the Izu Kyūkō Line, and is located 2.0 kilometers from the starting point of the line at Itō Station and 18.9 kilometers from Atami Station.

Station layout
Minami-Itō Station has a single elevated island platform, with the station building underneath. The station is staffed.

Platforms

Adjacent stations

History 
Minami-Itō Station was opened on December 10, 1961.

Passenger statistics
In fiscal 2017, the station was used by an average of 601 passengers daily (boarding passengers only).

Surrounding area
 Itō City Hospital

See also
 List of Railway Stations in Japan

References

External links

 Official home page

Railway stations in Japan opened in 1961
Railway stations in Shizuoka Prefecture
Izu Kyūkō Line
Itō, Shizuoka